In psychology, the self-confrontation method (SCM) is a technique for examining people's behavior modification. It relies on people's inconsistent knowledge and dissatisfaction with their own values, motivation, behaviors, or with their personal systems and those of significant others to make a change that patient needs to change. Self-confrontation psychology is based on two theories which are valuation theory and dialogical-self theory.



Background 
The self-confrontation method is a specific evaluation and intervention tool guided by the theory which focuses on the special attention to the individual's feelings and motivation with self-exploration. SCM is influenced by James's work(1890) and Merleau-Pony (1945,1962), as well as Bruner(1986) and Sarbin(1986). SCM is organized into a narrative structure when Hermans developed the Valuation Theory as a framework for the research of personal experience over time(1987-1989). Self-Confrontation does not correspond to one way, it can be used in different purposes such as psychotherapy and psychology.

Process 

The self-confrontation method is a relational process that involves researching and organising the client or subject's valuations, including the methods in which these valuations are reorganized over time. The process has been separated into three parts: 1) valuation elicitation; 2) affective rating; 3) evaluation and integration. Firstly, the construction of the client's valuation system is happening in the consultation between the client and psychologist. The consultation is about the basis open questions of the client's personal valuation which referring to their past, present and future. In the second phase of the SCM, a list of the affect items about the basic motives (S and O) will be given to the client to evaluate his or her emotional quality of the appraisal. S-motive is expressed self-esteem, strength, self-confidence, and O-motive is expressed tenderness, caring and love. In the last phase, there is a deep discussion about the content and valuation between client and psychologist. In this consultation, the client may realize that she has never listened to herself and may decide to pay attention to those situations that she conforms with other people require her to think or to do in automatically.

Theoretically, there is a set way of approaching the SCM. A distinction is seen within the relationship between a variety of one's valued aspects held during the course of their lives and the motives deriving and influencing these valued aspects that aren't clearly defined and not obviously conscious to one. when clients see their own valuational system is influenced by which basic motives, they can have a deep insight into the system. Therefore, the basic and the lack of the valuation system, as well as these characters can generally influence the client's well-being life. It works very usefully to help clients to realize the true qualities when they are in a time of intensive change which mean that they will less be influenced by external circumstances and have more control over life.

Theories

Valuation theory 
Valuation theory was developed by Hubert J. Hermans, it is initiated from a hypothesis that people are positive meaning constructors and they are constantly creating and re-organizing their lives. A central character of this theory is that any valuation has an affective component and that in this component the basic motives are expressed. It comprises three components: story, motivation and telling which form an adequate basis for understanding the client's self-narrative and the issues of emotion. Sarbin is one of the main advocates of the narrative method. He believes that story or narrative is a method space to organize plot, action and description of time and action. In addition, he explains that narrative organize people's silent stories of fantasies and daydreams, plans, memories, and even love and hates. The central factor of the narrative is real or fictional events that can only be understood in the context of time and space. Multiple and spatially oriented agents, as conscious beings, engage in a variety of actions, filling in the story. In the stories that were told, the actors are not only internationally purposeful and motivated, but the storytellers are also feeling motivated.

Within valuation theory, the valuation is viewed as a relevant meaning unit when people telling about their own life, such as a cherished memory, an interesting dream, a difficult problem or a good consultation with friends. These evaluations will be structured as a system and re-organized over time which can highlight the level of the initiative of the interpreter. The main idea of this theory is that every valuation has an affective component which expresses the basic motives. Based on this hypothesis, the theory holds the process of self-reflection and narration can be deepened by exploring the characteristics of the value of emotional motivation. The interpretation of these basic themes in self-narration is one of the main purposes of self- examination. On the other hand, the ‘self’ in valuation theory is viewed as an ‘Organized process’, it is emphasized that each person's unique experience of life's arrangement becomes a meaningful self-narrative. The characteristic of the process draws attention to the individual's experiences and historical qualities, which means that even people are living in present, but they might orient to the past or future.

Dialogical-Self Theory 
Dialogical-self theory(DST) combined two concepts of self and dialogue together to gain a deeper understanding of the interrelation between society. Normally, the key point of the ‘self’ is mean something ‘internal’ and occurs within the individual, while the conversation is usually associated with what is ‘external’, which is the process that takes place between people engaged in communication. In the theory of Dialogical-Self, the self refers to  ‘extended’ which means that individuals and groups in the society are incorporated into the micro-society of the self. As the result of this expansion, the ego includes not only the internal position but also external position. Not only the real other that exists outside the self, but also the imaginary other that is ingrained as the other within the self. DST postulates that the self as a psychosocial entity composed of internal and external self-positions. When some positions are self-silencing or suppressing others, monistic relationships prevail. On the contrary, when their positions are recognized and accepted in their differences and alternations, it is possible for the dialogue relationship to further develop and renew itself and others as a main part of the whole society.  

Moreover, DST is developed by the Mikhail Bakhtin when he read and inspired by the novel, created the idea of the ‘polyphonic novel’. The key point of polyphony is not about the author, is about the character in the story. In Bahktin's argument, the characters are not ‘obedient slaves’ serving Dostoyevsky's intentions, but relatively autonomous and may even disagree with or against the author's ideas. It is as if Dostoyevsky entered his novel and identified with different characters, who participated in the process of agreeing and disagreeing. It expresses the different and opposing world view of the ‘same’ Dostoyevsky. It is a comprehensive social-scientific theory included by the profound impact of the globalization in a process and the development of the individual. The main concept is around the historical changing in the social reality view and how these changes influenced the motives, emotions and conflict resolution. The dialogical relationships promote the individual, company, and culture from life.

Research 
Over the several years, SCM has gained the support for its value as a research tool ( Hermans, 1987, 1992; Hermans & Oles, 1994, 1999; Van Geel & De Mey, 2004; Van Geel, De Mey, Thissen-Pennings, & Benermacher, 2000). The researchers use the method as a strategy to study a series of topics and problems of the SCM. A preliminary study of self-confrontation is related to psychological attributes. This research focused on data about  the internal consistencies and intercorrelations of the S (self-enhancement), O (contact and union with others), P (positive affect), and N (negative affect) indices, and the discriminant validity of the method.

Hermans and Hermans-Jansen used case studies to describe the role of the SCM is a useful way to measure client change over the course of counseling. As an example, a client accepted three times self-investigations interspersed over the course of counseling. in the first investigation, the valuation showed more negative than positive which influence terms of self-enhancement (S) and other(O). The second investigation was completed after twelve months, it showed the high valuation associated with the rises level of S and dominance of N over P, which suggested an attitude of opposition or protest. The third investigation finished after 5 months following the second investigation. It included the valuation associated with the high level of S and P and lack of N influence. As the research from Hermans-Jansen, these cases provided the understanding of the client change as a continual process of cognition.

Hermans illustrated a case about 40 years old woman who faced some troubles at school where she taught. She often found that she was a ‘in-between’ person to involve in conflicts with school administrators (who happened to be her friends) and with her colleagues. She accepted twice interviews in 9 months apart from one another. Her first set of valuations was dominated and generally had low levels of self-improvement for most of her valuations. Based on the first set of valuations, her counselor designed homework to help focus on activities to improve herself. The second case reported a 18 years old girl who was a genius in art but always struggled with identity issues and focused on death. Her first set of valuations included thoughts of her dead grandmother, low self-enhancement, high contact with others and high negative impact. This structure is an object that is assumed to have a common pattern of loving tendencies towards someone of something that cannot be accessed. The second SCM was implemented two years later after the counseling to aim to promote her ability to express herself. Her valuation has changed by increasing in self-enhancement and contact and union with others. Therefore, these cases have shown that SCM is a useful procedure for promoting client insight and help clients incorporate conflicting emotions into their self-statements.

In order to understand more about the unconscious aspects of valuation, the psychologist decided to include dreams as part of self-investigation. Clients will be invited to talk about a dream that he or he considers is important at the end of the evaluation build phases. The dream is expressing as a continuous series of ‘image evaluations’, which is kind of same to Foulkes(1978) dream studies, one of the dreams is thought to be an image sentence. Dream as private myths and myths as collective dreams are unconscious levels of expression of human experience. Researches derived a motional profile from the client emotional rating of this part of the myth and introduced it into the analysis matrix of 100 individual clients. The result analysis of the highest relevant valuation reveals the theme of unrealized love which can be found earlier in the analysis of Rodin's sculptor Fugit Amor.

References 

Psychological methodology